Sky Rojo is a Spanish black comedy action drama television series, created by Álex Pina and Esther Martínez Lobato. The series traces three prostitutes who flee from their pimp. According to the creators, the series shows "the impunity, ambiguity and brutal reality of prostitution, and the psychological portraits of those on both sides of the scale". Pina and Martínez Lobato have described the series as "Latin pulp".

Produced by Vancouver Media and distributed by Netflix, the series premiered on 19 March 2021. Two seasons of eight 25-minute episodes each were announced. The series' second season premiered on 23 July. The third and final season was released on January 13, 2023.

Premise 
Coral, Wendy, and Gina, three prostitutes, go on the run in search of freedom while being chased by Romeo, their pimp from Las Novias Club in Tenerife, and his henchmen, Moisés and Christian. Together, the women embark on a frantic, chaotic journey during which they must face dangers of all kinds and live every second as if it were their last, while strengthening their friendship and discovering the most important thing: that together they are stronger and have more options to recover their lives.

Cast and characters
Legend
 = Main cast (credited)
 = Recurring cast (2+)
 = Guest cast (1)

Main
 Verónica Sánchez as Coral, a former biologist who works at Las Novias Club and sees her work as a means to escape from her dark past
 Miguel Ángel Silvestre as Moisés Expósito, one of Romeo's henchmen and Christian's older brother. He recruits women for Romeo and brings them to the club.
 Asier Etxeandia as Romeo, pimp and owner of Las Novias Club
 Lali Espósito as Wendy, a lesbian from Buenos Aires. She flees Villa 31 and becomes a sex worker in the brothel to make money so she can provide a better life for herself and her girlfriend.
 Yany Prado as Gina, a Cuban woman who was sex-trafficked to the club under the guise of accepting a waitressing job to provide for her young child and ailing mother
 Enric Auquer as Christian Expósito (seasons 1–2), one of Romeo's henchmen and Moisés's younger brother

Recurring
 Carmen Santamaría as Charlotte, the club's madam
 Cecilia Gómez as Gata, a sex worker at the club
 Godeliv Van den Brandt as Rubí, a sex worker at the club
 Penélope Guerrero as Tsunami, a sex worker at the club
  as Lupe, a sex worker at the club
 Niko Verona as Cachopo, Romeo's assistant
  as Fernando, owner of a motel and client of the club. He has a relationship with Gina.
 Paco Inestrosa as Arcadio
 Iván Yao as Xuan
 Antonio Fdez as Tony, barman at Club Las Novias
 Daniel Prim as Walter, barman

Guest
 Luis Zahera as Alfredo, veterinarian and client of the club
 Daria Krauzo as Bambi, a sex worker at the club
  as Dolores Expósito, mother of Moisés and Christian
 Yanet Sierra as Gina's mother
  as Fermín, a client of the club

Production
Filmed on location in Madrid and Tenerife, Sky Rojo was produced by Vancouver Media for Netflix. Álex Pina and Esther Martínez Lobato are the creators and executive producers of Sky Rojo alongside Jesús Colmenar, with support from co-executive producers David Barrocal, Migue Amoedo and David Victori. The original series is directed by Jesús Colmenar, Óscar Pedraza, David Victori, Albert Pintó, Javier Quintas and Eduardo Chapero-Jackson. The scriptwriting team is made up of Álex Pina, Esther Martínez Lobato, David Barrocal, David Oliva, Javier Gómez Santander, Juan Salvador López and Mercedes Rodrigo. Migue Amoedo has taken the lead as cinematographer alongside David Azcano and David Acereto, while Juan López Olivar and Cristina López Ferraz are heading up production management.

Filming began in Madrid on 18 November 2019, and later moved to Arico, Tenerife. Filming was set to move to Castilla–La Mancha in early 2020 and take place there for approximately four months. However, the project was delayed by the COVID-19 pandemic and filming continued in October 2020 in Madrid. While set in the south of Tenerife, the shooting location of Las Novias club was an estate near Huerta de Valdecarábanos, province of Toledo.

The series is set to last two seasons of eight 25-minutes episodes each. In a joint statement, the creators said: "We wanted Sky Rojo to have the same frenetic action as always, but to use that 25-minute runtime to underline the dynamic nature of the plot: the getaway, the race for survival. The third act of a movie or an episode is where all the energy converges to produce the most vibrant explosion of all the conflicts that are being narrated. What we set out to do was to make a constant third act, to funnel our entire story through that frenzied energy".

On 19 January 2021, it was announced via a teaser trailer that the series' first season would premiere exactly two months later, on 19 March. The series' official trailer was released on 2 March 2021.

Episodes

Season 1 (2021)

Season 2 (2021)
The second season of Sky Rojo was filmed before the first season even premiered. As with the former, the second season also consisted of eight episodes of around 25-five minutes each. On 29 March 2021, it was announced that the second season would premiere on 23 July 2021.

Season 3 (2023)
On 12 August 2021, it was announced that the series had been renewed for a third and final season. Asier Etxeandia, who plays Romeo, confirmed that the season was scheduled to begin filming in November 2021. In February 2022, Lali Espósito, who plays Wendy, announced in El Hormiguero that Rauw Alejandro will appear on the third and final season of Sky Rojo.

Reception

Public response
During its premiere weekend, Sky Rojo was the fourth most watched show on Netflix globally, and the most watched non-English language show in the world. It also was the most watched show in Argentina, Spain, Brazil, Colombia, Cyprus, the Dominican Republic, Greece, Israel, Jamaica, Paraguay, Switzerland, Turkey, Uruguay, and Venezuela, while reaching the top ten in sixty-one countries.

American business magazine Forbes reported that Sky Rojo was the most watched show in Spain the day after its release, outperforming Disney+'s The Falcon and the Winter Soldier (the platform's most-watched series premiere ever during its opening weekend) in that territory. According to TV Time, early performance data for Sky Rojo during its release weekend, from 9 March to 21 March, showed that the series entered the Top 5 for most-watched subscription video on demand originals across key European, Middle Eastern, African and Latin American markets. Sheena Scott of Forbes wrote that "with Argentine superstar Lali Espósito starring in the series, it is no surprise that Sky Rojo also topped Netflix's chart as the number one TV show in Argentina during its launching weekend". In the United States and the United Kingdom, however, Sky Rojo never entered the Top 10 TV shows chart on Netflix during its release weekend, despite receiving some favorable reviews from critics.

Critical reception

Sky Rojo was met with a very positive response from critics. Review aggregator website Rotten Tomatoes gave Sky Rojo an approval rating of 92% based on 13 reviews, with an average rating of 7.4/10. Multiple critics compared the series' cinematography with the films of Quentin Tarantino. Elizabeth Vincentelli of The New York Times described the series as "sheer excess" for its "simultaneously minimal and over the top" plot. Ellen E. Jones of The Guardian gave the series' first season four stars out of five and wrote: "Sky Rojo's punchy 25-minute runtime is never long enough to truly try the patience. Those wild cliffhanger endings should have you slamming "next episode" faster than Coral slams the accelerator at a busy intersection". NME'''s James McMahon gave the show three stars out of five and dubbed the show "cool" and "exciting", highlighting its "great music and solid performances". Juan Sanguno from El País wrote that "Sky Rojo turns every punch, every humiliation, and every threat into a triumph."Sky Rojo often got compared to Money Heist, with which it shared creators. In her review, Keyla Cobb of Decider wrote that those who loved Money Heist will love Sky Rojo since "both dramas look gorgeously slick, perfectly crumpling their on-the-run characters enough to look worn but still sexy" while also singling out both shows' convergence in their "dedication to humanity". Cobb concluded that "Sky Rojo feels like a successor to Money Heist". The reviewer also compared the series to other TV shows like Good Girls, Big Sky and Fargo since they all revolve around "panicked people who did something wrong and are now being chased by a nefarious force far more powerful than them".

Valerie Ettenhofer of Film School Rejects highlighted Sky Rojo "unique blend of dark humor, serious violence, and heightened drama". However, she wrote that the show is "neither as deep nor as clever as it thinks it is, but the thriller seems more concerned with being addictive than being perfect, and on that front, it succeeds". She criticized Moisés and Christian's "obnoxious amount of screen time" since "their frequent scenes are repetitive, unfocused, and not nearly as engaging as anything involving the women they're after", and that their scenes seem like mere "attempts to humanize the villains". Ultimately, Ettenhofer said that "Sky Rojo's greatest strengths are its lead [actresses and actors]". David Craig of Radio Times highlighted Verónica Sánchez's "strong" performance and gave the show four out of five stars. Craig wrote: "on paper, Sky Rojo sounds as if it should be a rather bleak affair but, for the most part, the series avoids becoming too heavy by balancing its serious themes with a pulpy sense of humour". Lali Espósito's performance was also singled out by many critics, with Trae Delellis of Miami New Times'' dubbing it as "mesmerizing and affecting".

References

External links
 
 

2021 Spanish television series debuts
2020s LGBT-related drama television series
2020s Spanish drama television series
Spanish action television series
Spanish crime television series
Spanish LGBT-related television shows
Spanish thriller television series
Spanish-language Netflix original programming
Lesbian-related television shows
Prostitution in television
Television series about revenge
Television shows filmed in Spain
Television shows set in the Canary Islands
Television series by Vancouver Media